is a railway station on the Hitahikosan Line in Tōhō, Fukuoka, Japan, operated by Kyushu Railway Company (JR Kyushu). To the north of the station, the 4380 m Shakadake Tunnel can be clearly seen, where a fatal tunnel collapse occurred during construction in 1953, killing 21 construction workers.

Lines
Chikuzen-Iwaya Station is served by the Hitahikosan Line.

Adjacent stations

See also
 List of railway stations in Japan

External links

  

Railway stations in Fukuoka Prefecture
Railway stations in Japan opened in 1956